Old St John the Baptist's Church is a redundant Anglican church in the village of Pilling, Lancashire, England. It stands  to the south of the new church, also dedicated to St John the Baptist.  The church is "an unusual survival of a small Georgian church". It is recorded in the National Heritage List for England as a designated Grade II* listed building, and it is under the care of the Churches Conservation Trust.

History
There was originally a tiny medieval chapel (28 feet by 19 feet 6 inches), on the other side of village, which was served until the Dissolution by the canons of Cockersand Abbey. In 1716 the parishioners of Pilling petitioned the Bishop of Chester for a new church.

St John's was built in 1717.  The only structural alteration since then has been the raising of the walls in 1813 to accommodate galleries.  It became redundant when the new church was built in 1887.  The church was vested in the Trust on 1 August 1986.

As Pilling was an ancient parochial chapelry in the parish of Garstang, the building was called a chapel rather than a church. Its minister was a perpetual curate rather than a vicar.

Architecture

Exterior
The church is constructed in red sandstone, with a plinth, chamfered quoins, and other dressings in grey sandstone.  The roof is slate.  It is a simple building, long and low.  On the west gable is a double bellcote.  The church has five bays.  On the south front is a single row of windows with round heads and a single chamfered mullion.  In the westernmost bay is a door over which is a smaller similar window, but with no mullion.  The door has a keystone inscribed with the date 1717, over which is a sandstone sundial with a plaque including the date 1766.  The east window is similar to the windows in the south wall, but with two mullions.  The north wall has two tiers of five windows; the lower windows have flat lintels, and the upper row consists of lunette windows.

Interior
The interior has a flat plaster ceiling. The walls are whitewashed and the church is floored with stone flags. There are galleries on the north and west sides, carried on Tuscan-style columns, and on the ground floor there are fixed simple oak benches, box pews (one of which carries the date 1719), and a two-decker pulpit. The sandstone font dates from the 18th century and is in the shape of an urn.  At the east end of the church, to the right of the large east window, in the form of a hatchment, are the Royal coat of arms of King George I dated 1719.

Before the alteration of the roof in 1813, the chapel would have had no ceiling and would have been open to the rafters, as can be seen from the height of the top of the east window. The pulpit was originally three-tier and was located against the north wall.

External features
The churchyard contains the war graves of two soldiers and a merchant sailor of World War I.

See also

Grade II* listed buildings in Lancashire
Listed buildings in Pilling

List of churches preserved by the Churches Conservation Trust in Northern England

References

Pilling, Old St John the Baptist
Churches completed in 1717
18th-century Church of England church buildings
Georgian architecture in England
Churches completed in 1813
Pilling, Old St John the Baptist
John, Pilling
Commonwealth War Graves Commission cemeteries in England
1717 establishments in England
Pilling